IJS may refer to:
 ISU Judging System or International Judging System, scoring system for figure skating
 Institute of Jazz Studies, library and archive in Newark, New Jersey
 International Journal of Speleology, scientific journal founded in 1978
 International Society for Evangelisation of the Jews, a Christian organisation, predecessor to the Christian Witness to Israel
 Islamabad Japanese School, international school in Islamabad
 Southeast Ijo language (ISO 639 code)
 Sisters of the Infant Jesus, Catholic religious institute in Paris